Uncivil Warriors is a 1935 short subject directed by Del Lord starring American slapstick comedy team The Three Stooges (Moe Howard, Larry Fine and Jerry Howard). It is the eighth entry in the series released by Columbia Pictures starring the comedians, who released 190 shorts for the studio between 1934 and 1959.

Plot
Set during the American Civil War, the short begins with a Northern General (James C. Morton) assigning Larry, Moe, and Curly, as Operators 12, 14 and 15, respectively, (but no Operator 13, a reference to a Civil War movie of the previous year) to sneak behind enemy lines and obtain secrets. Disguising themselves as southern officers and taking the names Lieutenant Duck (Larry), Captain Dodge (Moe) and Major Hyde (Curly), they insinuate themselves into the mansion of southern officer, Colonel Butts (Bud Jamison).

During preparations for a dinner party at the mansion, Curly, more interested in the Colonel's daughter, Judith Butts (Phyllis Crane), manages to mistake a quilted potholder for a cake, resulting in a feather-coughing scene. The short concludes with an episode in which Larry and Curly disguise themselves as, respectively, Captain Dodge's father and wife. This leads to a controversial gag in which Major "Bloodhound" Filbert (Ted Lorch) inquires about Captain Dodge's baby. Moe runs off and brings in a swaddled infant, which is revealed to be black, thus giving away the Stooges' charade.

The three of them run for their lives and hide in a "log" — which turns out to be a hidden cannon — which is fired by the Confederates. The Union General wonders aloud where the three spies are. At that moment, the trio promptly land on the General from the sky.

Cast

Credited

Production notes
Uncivil Warriors was filmed on March 13–18, 1935. It is the first short in which the Stooges mention "Good Time Charlie". When the Stooges meet a guard, they often reference Charlie. The guard asks who Charlie is, and a Stooge replies that "everybody knows Charlie. He walks like this." The Stooges then demonstrate a silly walk until they get clear of the guard, at which point they take off running. This is a recurring joke in the Stooge shorts. In Uncivil Warriors, they actually meet a soldier named Charlie, who asks the Stooges, "Are you all looking for me?"

The potholder gag would later appear in the Shemp-era short Three Hams on Rye during a live theatrical production. A similar sequence also appears in the 1947 short All Gummed Up, also featuring Shemp. The scene is nearly identical, with bubblegum being used in the place of a potholder, the stooges coughing up bubbles rather than feathers as a result.

When Moe brings the black baby into the Colonel's office he attempts to explain how the baby got his dark complexion ("We had him down the beach all summer...he got quite sunburned!"); this is sometimes deleted for U.S. television broadcasts.

The introductory music over the titles is a medley of "Battle Hymn of the Republic" (most popular marching song of the Union Army) and "Dixie" (which had the same status in the Confederate Army).

References

External links 
 
 
Uncivil Warriors at threestooges.net

1935 films
The Three Stooges films
American black-and-white films
1935 comedy films
American Civil War films
Films directed by Del Lord
Columbia Pictures short films
American slapstick comedy films
1930s English-language films
1930s American films